The 1906 Lehigh Brown and White football team was an American football team that represented Lehigh University as an independent during the 1906 college football season. In its first season under head coach Byron W. Dickson, the team compiled a 5–5–1 record and was outscored by a total of 150 to 108. The team played its home games at Lehigh Field in Bethlehem, Pennsylvania.

Schedule

References

Lehigh
Lehigh Mountain Hawks football seasons
Lehigh football